Artyom Anatolyevich Voronkin (born 19 February 1986) is a Russian footballer.

Career
He made his Russian Premier League debut for FC Terek Grozny on 14 March 2008 in a game against PFC Krylia Sovetov Samara.

In March 2015, Voronkin signed for FC Sakhalin Yuzhno-Sakhalinsk.

References

External links
  Player page on the official FC Terek Grozny website
 

1986 births
Sportspeople from Rostov Oblast
Living people
Russian footballers
Association football midfielders
Russian Premier League players
Russian expatriate footballers
Expatriate footballers in Kazakhstan
FC Zhenis Astana players
FC Chernomorets Novorossiysk players
FC Akhmat Grozny players
FC Luch Vladivostok players
FC SKA-Khabarovsk players
Russian expatriate sportspeople in Kazakhstan
FC Khimki players
FC Lokomotiv Kaluga players
FC Orenburg players
FC Sakhalin Yuzhno-Sakhalinsk players
FC Armavir players
FC Neftekhimik Nizhnekamsk players
FC Lokomotiv Moscow players
FC Urozhay Krasnodar players
FC Avangard Kursk players
FC Ararat Moscow players